The Siletz Reservation is a 5.852 sq mi (15.157 km²) Indian reservation in Lincoln County, Oregon, United States, owned by the Confederated Tribes of Siletz. The reservation is made up of numerous non-contiguous parcels of land in east-central Lincoln County, mostly east of the city of Siletz, between it and the Polk County line.

History

Establishment
In November 1855 President of the United States Franklin Pierce issued an executive order creating a reservation for the relocation of the indigenous peoples of the coastal region of the Oregon Territory. A 120-mile-long strip of land was designated for the Coast Indian Reservation. This reservation extended from Cape Lookout in Tillamook County on the north coast, extending to the Siltcoos River, near Florence in the South.

As Oregon's population grew, the federal government opened up some reservation lands for settlement by white newcomers, who displaced the indigenous peoples. The reservation Area was reduced and fragmented by the executive order December 21st 1865 of President Andrew Johnson and by the Act of Congress March 3rd 1875. Tribal groups reestablished a presence in isolated portions of their traditional homelands. 

Under the Dawes Act of 1887, the government divided communal tribal lands for allocation of individual plots of 160 acres each to heads of households of tribal members; any remaining acreage was classified as "surplus" and sold to non-natives. This break-up of communal lands accelerated the process of atomization of the state's indigenous peoples.

Since the late 20th century, the federally recognized Confederated Tribes of Siletz Indians has established casino gambling on its lands and generated monies for its people's welfare, as well as contributing to county needs.

Culture and lifestyle

Tribal housing 
The Siletz tribe has built several different areas for tribal members to live. The tribe has created a rent-to-buy style program so that tribal members are able to own their own houses. The tribe has also created elders housing units for the elderly tribal members, and they boast several different areas where members are able to rent tribal apartments, these apartments are spread all over the city on tribal properties.

Tribal events 
The Siletz reservation is home to many tribal programs. The most prominent is the annual celebration held in Siletz on top of Government Hill, the Nesika Illahee Pow-wow.  This event happens during the second weekend of August. The pow-wow opens up every year with a parade and leads into the celebration that lasts all weekend. Siletz is also home to many other cultural events such as a culture camp, youth activities, and activities for elders. The reservation also houses the Siletz dance house where solstice celebrations take place along with many other events like weddings and coming-of-age ceremonies.

Education 
There is one K-12th grade school in Siletz, the Siletz Valley Charter School also known as the Siletz Valley Early College Academy. The school had been closed for many years but reopened in 2006 due to funding provided by Chinook Winds Casino. It is a public school within the Lincoln County School District.

See also

Tolowa language

Footnotes

Further reading

 David R.M. Beck, "'Standing Out Here in the Surf': The Termination and Restoration of the Coos, Lower Umpqua and Siuslaw Indians of Western Oregon in Historical Perspective," Oregon Historical Quarterly, vol. 110, no. 1 (Spring 2009), pp. 6–37. In JSTOR.
 C.F. Coan, "The Adoption of the Reservation Policy in Pacific Northwest, 1853–1855," Quarterly of the Oregon Historical Society, vol. 23, no. 1 (March 1922), pp. 1–38. In JSTOR.
 Wilkinson, Charles F. The People Are Dancing Again: The History of the Siletz Tribe of Western Oregon. Seattle: University of Washington Press, 2010.

External links
Confederated Tribes of Siletz homepage

Geography of Lincoln County, Oregon
American Indian reservations in Oregon
Confederated Tribes of Siletz Indians
1855 establishments in Oregon Territory